The 2015 Asia Rugby Women's Sevens Series is the 16th edition of Asia's continental sevens tournament for women. It was played over two legs hosted in Qingdao, China and Sri Lanka.

China 
5-6 September 2015 at Qingdao, China

Pool W

Pool X

Playoffs
Quarter-finals

 Japan 50 - 0 Singapore
 Hong Kong 31 - 0 Uzbekistan
 Kazakhstan 40 - 5 Sri Lanka
 China 24 - 5 Thailand

Plate
Semi-finals
Singapore 21 - 7 Uzbekistan
Thailand 24 - 14 Sri Lanka

7th place
Uzbekistan 17-14 Sri Lanka 

Final (5th place)
Thailand 27-0 Singapore 

Cup
Semi-finals
Hong Kong 5 - 0 Japan
China 22 - 17 Kazakhstan

3rd/4th place
Japan 15-0 Kazakhstan 

Cup final
Hong Kong 26-15 China

Sri Lanka 
10-11 October 2015 at Colombo, Sri Lanka.

Pool W

Japan 21-17 Uzbekistan
Hong Kong 5-7 Thailand
Japan 38-0 Thailand
Hong Kong 52-0 Uzbekistan
Thailand 22-0 Uzbekistan
Hong Kong 5-15 Japan

Pool X

Kazakhstan 17-10 Sri Lanka
China 55-0 Singapore
Kazakhstan 43-7 Singapore
China 45-0 Sri Lanka
Singapore 10-28 Sri Lanka
China 7-7 Kazakhstan

Playoffs
Quarter-finals

 Kazakhstan 7-14 Hong Kong
 Japan 38 - 0 Singapore
 China 55 - 5 Uzbekistan
 Thailand 17 - 0 Sri Lanka

Plate
Semi-finals
Kazakhstan 29 - 0 Singapore
Uzbekistan 17 - 7 Sri Lanka

7th place
Singapore 17-14 Sri Lanka 

Final (5th place)
Kazakhstan 43-0 Uzbekistan 

Cup
Semi-finals
Hong Kong 0 - 17 Japan
China 24 - 5 Thailand

3rd/4th place
Hong Kong 21-15 Thailand 

Cup final
Japan 33-12 China

Final standings

References 

2015
2015 rugby sevens competitions
2015 in Asian rugby union
2015 in women's rugby union
International rugby union competitions hosted by Sri Lanka
2015 in Sri Lankan sport